The discography of American singer and ex-Pussycat Dolls member Ashley Roberts consists of one studio album, two lead singles, two promotional singles, and four music videos.

In 2010, Roberts announced that she was in the studio recording songs for her first solo album. Her first solo song, a cover of "A Summer Place", was released on iTunes on September 28. She also made an appearance in ex-bandmate Wyatt's music video for the single "Stars in Your Eyes". On June 14, 2012, Roberts made a cameo appearance in Bobby Newberry's music video for his debut single "Dirrty Up", with ex-bandmate Melody Thornton. On October 10, 2012, she released a preview of a cover version of Bobby Newberry's "All in a Day", produced by The Invaders. The full version was released at the end of October. On November 5, 2012, Roberts announced that her first promotional single would be "Yesterday", released that week via Cherry Red Records. On March 31, 2014, she announced her debut single "Clockwork", released on May 25, 2014. The single reached No. 175 in the UK and was released through Metropolis London Music; Roberts had parted ways with her former record label sometime the year before.

In June 2014, Roberts announced her debut album, entitled Butterfly Effect, to be released September 1, 2014. It was preceded by the album's second single "Woman Up". The single failed to chart, whereas the album peaked at No. 36 on the UK Independent Chart.

Studio albums

As lead artist

Promotional singles

Other solo songs

Music videos

Other appearances

References 

Discographies of American artists